Erythrothrips is a genus of predatory thrips in the family Aeolothripidae. There are about 11 described species in Erythrothrips.

Species
These 11 species belong to the genus Erythrothrips:
 Erythrothrips arizonae Moulton, 1911
 Erythrothrips bishoppi Moulton, 1929
 Erythrothrips brasiliensis Hood
 Erythrothrips costalis Hood
 Erythrothrips diabolus (Priesner, 1932)
 Erythrothrips durango Watson, 1924
 Erythrothrips fasciculatus Moulton, 1929
 Erythrothrips keeni Moulton, 1929
 Erythrothrips loripes Hood
 Erythrothrips nigripennis Hood
 Erythrothrips stygicus Hood

References

Further reading

 
 
 
 

Thrips
Articles created by Qbugbot